The GIPF Project is a series of seven abstract strategy games by designer Kris Burm.

The series is named after the first game, GIPF. All the games take place on some form of hexagonal board and involve the diminishment of each player's playing area. Each of the games may be played individually. However, the series also allows players to introduce into GIPF certain new pieces with special powers, called "potentials", upon their victory in any other game in the series.

The idea of introducing additional games that can be used to affect the outcome of the main game came from Burm's childhood, when he and his brother would "race" cars around a rug.  For each turn, they would play another game, and the winner of that game would get to roll six dice to determine his car's movement, while the loser would roll just five.

, YINSH, TZAAR, DVONN, LYNGK, ZÈRTZ, GIPF, and PÜNCT are, respectively, the 3rd, 8th, 11th, 19th, 20th, 35th, and 80th highest ranked Abstract Games on Boardgamegeek. TAMSK, which was officially removed from the series, is nevertheless ranked 87th. YINSH, DVONN, and ZÈRTZ have each won the Mensa Select award.

List of games 

GIPF is a game of pushing.
TAMSK is a game of time. (replaced by TZAAR)
ZÈRTZ is a game of sacrifice.
DVONN is a game of towers.
YINSH is a game of flipping.
PÜNCT is a game of connection.
TZAAR is a game of capture and stacking. (replacing TAMSK)
LYNGK is a game of networking.

The games are based on elements: Tamsk (time), Zèrtz (water), Dvonn (fire), Yinsh (air), Tzaar (earth), and Pünct (the interconnectivity of the brain). These elements are brought together in Gipf.

Most of the games in the series can be played free online (for example, at BoardSpace.net) or against freely available computer opponents.

Origin of the names of the games 
"GIPF" derives from the German word for a mountain summit ("Gipfel"), where the original game was conceived.

Subsequent games were named to include one vowel and 4 consonants, but to otherwise remain unrelated to existing language. "Tzaar" is the only game deviating from these naming conventions, due to disputes with the game publisher.

See also
 List of world championships in mind sports
 Abalone

References

Abstract strategy games
Mensa Select winners